The 1938–39 Primeira Divisão season was the fifth season of top-tier football in Portugal. The competition was renamed Campeonato Nacional da Primeira Divisão (National Championship of the First Division) or Primeira Divisão for short.

Overview

It was contested by 8 teams, and F.C. Porto won the championship.

League standings

Results

References

Primeira Liga seasons
1938–39 in Portuguese football
Portugal